The Women's 4 × 100 metre freestyle relay event at the 2010 Commonwealth Games took place on 8 October 2010, at the SPM Swimming Pool Complex.

A final was held only, containing eight countries.

Final

References

Aquatics at the 2010 Commonwealth Games
2010 in women's swimming